Arne Cassaert (born 20 November 2000) is a Belgian professional footballer who plays for Virton on loan from Cercle Brugge as a defender.

Club career
On 20 November 2019, Cassaert signed his first professional contract with Cercle Brugge. Cassaert made his professional debut for Oostende in a 2-1 Belgian First Division A loss to Standard Liège on 1 December 2019.

On 14 January 2022, Cassaert was loaned to Knokke until the end of the season.

On 15 July 2022, Cassaert moved on a new loan to Virton.

References

External links

Cercle Brugge Profile

2000 births
People from Torhout
Footballers from West Flanders
Living people
Belgian footballers
Association football defenders
Cercle Brugge K.S.V. players
Royal Knokke F.C. players
R.E. Virton players
Belgian Pro League players
Challenger Pro League players